is a fighting game developed and published by Namco. It was originally released for arcades in 1994, and ported to the PlayStation a year later. The game was well-received by critics, and it would serve as the first entry in the popular Tekken series, with a sequel, Tekken 2, being released in 1995.

Gameplay
As with many fighting games, players choose a character from a lineup and engage in hand-to-hand combat with an opponent. Unlike most fighting games of the time, Tekken allows the player to control each of the fighter's four limbs independently. The player can watch the animation on screen and figure out the appropriate command (if the character kicks low with their right leg, the move is likely to be executed by pressing down and right kick or a similar variation). By default, there are two rounds of combat. However, the players have a choice from one to five rounds, as well as options for the time limit of each round. If the time limit for the round expires, the character with more health remaining will be declared the winner; if one does not exist, the round will be a draw.

In the game, the name of the location is displayed in the bottom right corner of the screen. Unlike in the sequels, the locations were all representations of real places and included Acropolis, Angkor Wat, Chicago, Fiji, King George Island, Kyoto, Marine Stadium, Monument Valley, Szechwan, Venezia, and Windermere.

Characters

The original arcade version features eight playable fighters. Each has a special "sub-boss" associated with them, who will be fought in Stage 8, followed by the final boss, Heihachi Mishima. The sub-boss characters are clones in terms of moveset, with only a handful of moves distinguishing them from the original.

All sub-bosses and Heihachi were never made playable in the original arcade version. When the game was ported to the PlayStation, however, they were made unlockable by clearing Arcade Mode using different characters. In addition, the console version also adds Kazuya's alter ego, Devil, who serves as Heihachi's final boss; and can be unlocked as a costume for Kazuya by completing the Galaga-based minigame. All in all, a total of 17 playable fighters exist in the console version. A cutscene is unlocked when the player finishes the home version's Arcade Mode with each of the original eight characters.

Playable fighters

 Unlockable character in home version, unplayable in arcade version
 Home version exclusive and unlockable and palette swap

Plot
When Kazuya Mishima was 5 years old his father Heihachi Mishima carried him to the top of a mountain and callously throwed him off a cliff to test his son's strength, whether he is fit to lead the Mishima Zaibatsu, the family business, and to see if he will be able to climb back up the same cliff. Kazuya survives the initial fall, but left a large scar on his chest which causes a demonic entity within him, called the Devil Gene, to activate, offering Kazuya the opportunity to gain immense strength and power. Driven by his thirst for revenge, he climbs up the mountainside. To further motivate Kazuya, Heihachi adopts the Chinese orphan Lee Chaolan and raises him as a rival to his true son, who he felt was too weak to lead his Mishima Zaibatsu company.

Over the years, Kazuya travels around the world and competes in martial arts competitions, becoming an undefeated champion, with the only blemish on his record being a draw against Paul Phoenix, an American martial artist who seeks to settle the score with him. 21 years later, Heihachi decides to test his son's strength and worth and announces the King of Iron Fist Tournament, Nina Williams the first-born daughter of an Irish father, former assassin Richard Williams, and a British mother in Ireland, Heather Williams as was her sister, Anna, had been hired during the tournament to assassinate Heihachi. However, she failed when she was defeated by Anna. Afterwards Kazuya went to go on to defeat Lee in the later stages of the tournament, and narrowly defeated Paul in a furious battle that lasted for hours in the semi-finals, Kazuya reaches the finals where he battles Heihachi. However, Heihachi is unexpectedly defeated by Kazuya, empowered by the strength given to him by the Devil Gene, in an intense father-son battle. In an act of revenge, Kazuya picks up his father's unconscious body and tosses him down the same cliff that he was thrown off as a child. Smiling to himself, Kazuya becomes the owner of the Mishima Zaibatsu.

Development and release
Tekken was not originally conceived as a fighting game. The project began as an internal Namco test case for animating 3D character models, and eventually incorporated texture mapping similar to that found in Namco's 1993 racing game Ridge Racer. In 1994, Namco acquired developers from longtime competitor Sega, which had recently created the first 3D fighting game with 1993's Virtua Fighter. Namco's research managing director Shegeichi Nakamura had met with Sony Computer Entertainment head Ken Kutaragi in 1993 to discuss the preliminary PlayStation specifications, with Namco subsequently developing the Namco System 11 arcade board based on PlayStation hardware and Tekken as their answer to Sega's popular Virtua Fighter. Tekken was initially planned for the Namco System 22, after Namco heard Sega was developing Virtua Fighter 2 for their new Sega Model 2 arcade board, before the development of Tekken was later moved to the System 11 after the meeting with Kutaragi.

The game was originally going to be titled Rave War, but in its final stages of development it was changed to Tekken. Also known as Rave Wars, the prototype was demonstrated at the Amusement & Music Operators Association (AMOA) Expo in September 1994, before being renamed Tekken upon release.

Directed by Virtua Fighter designer Seiichi Ishii, Tekken was intended to be a fundamentally similar title, with the addition of detailed textures and twice the frame rate. Tekken was further distinguished by its intuitive control scheme and memorable characters. Because it was developed for Namco's System 11 arcade board, which was based on raw PlayStation hardware, Tekken was easily ported to the latter. It was the first arcade game to use this board. Tekken was marketed to small arcades as a cheaper alternative to Sega's Virtua Fighter 2, which was released for the more expensive Model 2 arcade board. Namco held a promotional tour to market the arcade game across North America in early 1995, holding video game competition tournaments in twelve cities.

Originally released for the arcades in late 1994, Tekken was later ported to the PlayStation. The console version allowed players to unlock mid-boss characters when the game was beaten and had full-motion videos. The PlayStation 2 version of Tekken 5 features the arcade version of Tekken (being an emulated version of its arcade counterpart as well as the other two that were included in the arcade history mode). In 2005, Namco re-released Tekken as part of the NamCollection compilation for the PlayStation 2 to celebrate the company's 50th anniversary.

Reception

Commercial
In Japan, Game Machine listed it on their February 1, 1995 issue as being the fifth most-popular arcade game for the previous two weeks. It went on to be Japan's fourth highest-grossing arcade game of 1995, below Virtua Fighter 2, Street Fighter Zero and Vampire Hunter: Darkstalkers' Revenge. In the United States, it was one of top five highest-grossing arcade conversion kits of 1995.

Tekken was the first PlayStation game to sell over a million units. In Japan, it sold 942,000 units in 1995, making it the fourth best-selling home video game of 1995, below Dragon Quest VI, Chrono Trigger and Virtua Fighter 2. Tekken was also a best-seller in the United Kingdom, where it was the top-selling game in October and December 1995. In the United States, the game sold 786,556 units, for a combined  units sold in Japan and the United States.

Guinness World Records awarded Tekken with multiple records in the Guinness World Records Gamer's Edition 2008. These include, "First PlayStation Game to Sell Over One Million Units", "First Fighting Game To Feature Simulated 3D", as well as a record for the entire series as "The Best Selling Fighting Series for PlayStation Consoles."

Critical
Tekken was well-received by game critics. The arcade prototype Rave War demonstrated at AMOA 1994 received a positive preview from Electronic Gaming Monthly, with a writer for the magazine comparing it favorably with Virtua Fighter 2 and stating "I found Rave War quite a bit more fun to play."

On release of the PlayStation version, Famicom Tsūshin (Famitsu) scored Tekken a 38 out of 40, while giving it an 8 out of 10 in their Reader Cross Review. Edge opined that, despite "lacking the overall visual allure" of Virtua Fighter 2, Tekken "not only matches" the "style and quality of Sega's character animation, but it pushes its rival to the wire in playability terms, too." GamePro called the PlayStation version "one of the best arcade-to-home translations ever" and commented that while the graphics look rough and blocky compared to Battle Arena Toshinden, the moves all have a clear and definite usefulness. They also praised the absence of ring-outs and the sound effects, and concluded "With impressive controls, lots of fighters, and strategic gameplay, Tekken makes Toshinden look more like pretty fighting than a real fight." Maximum called it "far and away the finest beat 'em up to grace this super console so far", citing the well-balanced player characters, "innovative" control mechanic of assigning one button to each limb, complexity of the moves, and ten playable boss characters, and arguing that the game is superior to Toshinden in both gameplay and graphics. However, they did criticize the poor PAL optimization of the European release. Like GamePro, Next Generation considered the game's graphics to be its weakest point, specifically the lack of animation on the backgrounds. They nonetheless considered it a new standard for polygonal fighting games, remarking in particular that the controls are easy to master and every character in the game has their own unique and compelling special move. In 1996, GamesMaster ranked the game 49th on their "Top 100 Games of All Time."

Notes

References

External links
Official website  (archived)

1994 video games
Lake District in fiction
Multiplayer and single-player video games
Namco arcade games
PlayStation (console) games
PlayStation 2 games
PlayStation Network games
Sichuan in fiction
Sony Interactive Entertainment games
Tekken games
Video games scored by Nobuyoshi Sano
Video games scored by Shinji Hosoe
Video games set in Antarctica
Video games set in Arizona
Video games set in Athens
Video games set in Cambodia
Video games set in Chiba Prefecture
Video games set in Chicago
Video games set in China
Video games set in Cumbria
Video games set in Fiji
Video games set in Kyoto
Video games set in Venice